Jamshid Mahmoudi (Persian: جمشید محمودی, born 1983) is an Afghan film director, screenwriter and producer. Mahmoudi is best known for his works A Few Cubic Meters of Love (2014), Rona, Azim's Mother (2018), and The Lion Skin (2022–2023).

Early life 
Mahmoudi was born in 1983 in Parvan, Afghanistan. He is the brother of Navid Mahmoudi.

Filmography

Feature films

Home video

Television

References

External links 
 

People from Parwan Province
Persian-language film directors
Afghan film directors
Living people
1983 births